Saleem Nasir (Urdu‎; 1944 – 1989) was a Pakistani film and TV actor. He appeared in the PTV drama serial Angan terha.

Early life and career

Saleem Nasir was born to a Pathan family in Nagpur, British India, on 15 November 1944. He had a successful, though short, career in TV and film acting.

 Film Zaib-un-Nisa (1976). Other cast: Waheed Murad, Shamim Ara, Aaliya. Film Director: Fareed Ahmed
 In Aangan Terha, (PTV drama serial) Salim Nasir played the role of a servant, Akbar, who used to be a dancer, before being hired as a servant by a retired Civil servant, Shakeel, dubbed as Mehboob Ahmed. Other cast: Bushra Ansari, Shakeel, Arshad Mehmood. Director: Qaiser Farooq. Writer: Anwar Maqsood. The serial was forced to stop due to pressure from the Martial Law administration as the script written by Anwar Maqsood was indirectly criticizing the Army Rule during General Zia-ul-Haq's era.
 In Dastak (1986), (PTV drama serial), he played the role of a  lawyer. Other cast: Ayaz Naik, Shazia Akhtar, Qazi Wajid.
 In Ankahi , he played an authoritative role. It is a story of ordinary people trying to make it against all odds. Other cast: Shehnaz Sheikh, Shakeel, Javed Sheikh, and young Jibran. Director: Shoaib Mansoor/ Mohsin Ali. Writer: Haseena Moin.
 In Nishan-e-Haider", he played the role of Captain Sarwar Shaheed.
 In Aakhri Chattan, he played the role of Sultan Jalal ad-Din Manguberdi
 In Jangloos, A PTV drama as 'Mian Ji' (Last television play)
 Salim Nasir made a guest appearance in Anwar Maqsood's PTV stage show, Silver Jubilee, in 1983.
 In Yanaseeb Clinic he played the role of a director.
 In Haseena Moin's 'Bandish' he played opposite Khalida Riyasat, Mahmood Masood, Talat Hussain, and Zafar Masood. The serial was directed by Shirin Khan and Mohsin Ali.

Awards
 Pride of Performance Award by the President of Pakistan in 1990.

Death 
At the age of 45, Salim Nasir died of a heart attack on 24 September 1989.

See also 
 List of Lollywood actors

References

External links 
 , Filmography of actor Salim Nasir
 Filmography of actor Salim Nasir on Complete Index To World Film (CITWF) website 

1944 births
1989 deaths
Muhajir people
People from Mardan District
Pakistani male film actors
Pakistani male television actors
Recipients of the Pride of Performance
Male actors from Karachi
20th-century Pakistani male actors